Ransford-Yeboah Königsdörffer (born 13 September 2001) is a professional footballer who plays as a right winger for  club Hamburger SV.

A former youth international for Germany, he has since switched allegiances to represent Ghana internationally.

Early and personal life
Königsdörffer was born in Berlin to a Ghanaian mother and a German father.

Club career

Dynamo Dresden
Königsdörffer played youth football for Minerva Berlin, SCC Berlin and Hertha BSC before joining the youth setup at Dynamo Dresden in the summer of 2019. Königsdörffer made his debut for Dresden as a substitute in a 2–0 away defeat to 1. FC Nürnberg. In February 2020, Königsdörffer signed a three-year contract with Dynamo Dresden, lasting until 2022. He appeared 7 times for the club during the 2019–20 season as they finished bottom of the 2. Bundesliga and were relegated to the 3. Liga.

On 29 October 2020, his contract was further extended to 2023, before scoring his first competitive goal two days later in a 3–0 victory over SV Meppen. After providing the assist for Dresden's first goal in first-half stoppage time, he converted a Christoph Daferner cross to put Dresden 2–0 up in the 59th minute. He tested positive for COVID-19 in mid-April 2021, but returned to first-team action for a 2–0 victory over Viktoria Köln on 8 May 2021. Dynamo were promoted back to the Bundesliga as champions of the 3. Liga, with Königsdörffer having scored 7 goals in 34 appearances across the 2020–21 season.

Königsdörffer made 30 league appearances for Dynamo Dresden during the 2021–22 season, scoring 5 goals, as the club finished 16th before losing to 1. FC Kaiserslautern in the relegation play-off, and were therefore relegated to the 3. Liga.

Hamburger SV
On 28 June 2022, it was announced that Königsdörffer had signed for 2. Bundesliga club Hamburger SV on a four-year contract for a fee of €1.2 million.

International career

Being born to a Ghanaian father and a German-Guadeloupean mother, Königsdörffer was able to choose to represent either the countries at international level.

On 2 September 2021, he made his official debut for the German under-21 national team, coming in as a substitute for Youssoufa Moukoko at the 73rd minute of a 6-0 win against San Marino in the 2023 European Under-21 Championship qualifiers.

In July 2022, the president of the Ghana FA, Kurt Okraku, announced that Königsdörffer was one of the few players that had officially switched allegiances to represent the Ghanaian senior national team internationally. He debuted with Ghana as a late substitute in a 1–0 friendly win over Nicaragua on 27 September 2022. He was however excluded from Ghana's 2022 World Cup squad, declaring himself "disappointed".

Career statistics

References

External links

 Dynamo Dresden Profile
 
 

2001 births
Living people
Footballers from Berlin
Ghanaian footballers
Ghana international footballers
German footballers
Germany under-21 international footballers
Ghanaian people of German descent
German sportspeople of Ghanaian descent
Association football forwards
Hertha BSC players
Dynamo Dresden players
Hamburger SV players
2. Bundesliga players
3. Liga players